Five Points is an unincorporated community in Madison Township, Morgan County, in the U.S. state of Indiana.

History
Five Points is so named due to the fact that five different roads meet at one single point.

Geography

References

Unincorporated communities in Morgan County, Indiana
Unincorporated communities in Indiana